The Aeromonadales are an order of Pseudomonadota, with 10 genera in two families. The species are anaerobic. The cells are rod-shaped. Some species of this order are motile by a single polar flagellum; others are not motile.

References

 
Gammaproteobacteria